Palmer Edward Retzlaff (August 21, 1931 – April 10, 2020), known as Pete Retzlaff and nicknamed "Pistol Pete" and "The Baron", was a professional American football player and general manager.

Early life
Retzlaff played football at Ellendale High School in Ellendale, North Dakota, and starred in track and field and football at South Dakota State College. In 1952, he rushed for 1,016 yards, a school record. He was later inducted into the school's athletic Hall of Fame.

Football career
Retzlaff was selected in the 1953 NFL Draft by the Detroit Lions of the National Football League but he did not make the team. After two years in the U.S. Army he was sold to the Philadelphia Eagles, where he played running back, wide receiver and tight end for 11 seasons, having converted from fullback in the start of his career. In 1958, despite having never caught a pass in college, he led the NFL with 56 pass receptions. He went to the Pro Bowl five times, and he won the Bert Bell Award for NFL player of the year in 1965, when he caught 66 passes including ten touchdowns. He was president of the NFL Players Association. He averaged 16.4 yards per catch and lost only four fumbles in his career.

In 2005, he was named to the Professional Football Researchers Association Hall of Very Good in the association's third HOVG class.

Post football career
From 1969 to 1972, he was the Eagles' vice president and general manager. In 1973 and 1974, he worked as a color analyst for NFL coverage on CBS television.

Retzlaff's number 44 jersey has been retired by the Eagles. When he retired, he was the alltime leader for receptions and receiving yards for Philadelphia (on his death in 2020, he was still third in receptions and second in yards, having been passed in both by Harold Carmichael).

Personal life
Retzlaff married his wife Patty in 1954, having four children.

Retzlaff died on April 10, 2020, in Pottstown, Pennsylvania, at the age of 88.

References

1931 births
2020 deaths
American football ends
American football halfbacks
American football tight ends
Philadelphia Eagles executives
Philadelphia Eagles players
South Dakota State Jackrabbits football players
National Football League announcers
National Football League general managers
Eastern Conference Pro Bowl players
People from Ellendale, North Dakota
Players of American football from North Dakota
Presidents of the National Football League Players Association
Military personnel from North Dakota
Trade unionists from North Dakota
National Football League players with retired numbers